Caoimhín Agyarko Hynes is an Irish professional boxer who held the WBA International middleweight title in 2021. He is the current WBA International light middleweight champion which he has held since 2022.

Early life 
Agyarko was born in Croydon, England and is from Belfast. His mother's side of the family is from Turf Lodge, Belfast and he fought with Holy Trinity boxing club, Belfast as a child and young man.

In 2017, at age 20, Agyarko was attacked by a gang in Belfast. A fight occurred and he was hospitalised with a gash down the side of his face and neck that was life-threatening.

Boxing career 
Agyarko is a middleweight orthodox boxer and is signed with Matchroom Boxing with Eddie Hearn.

His goal is to become the first ever black, Irish world champion boxer.

Professional boxing record

References 

Irish male boxers
1997 births
Living people